Alexander Madsen (born January 26, 1995) is a Finnish professional basketball player for AEK Athens of the Greek Basket League and the Basketball Champions League.

Club career
In Finland, Alexander Madsen played for Kouvot from 2012–2016.

He later played for USK Praha of the National Basketball League (Czech Republic) from 2016 to 2018.

On July 25, 2022, Madsen signed a one-year contract with AEK Athens of the Greek Basket League.

National team 
In the past, Madsen played 64 matches combined for his country's youth national teams.

Later, he became a member of the senior Finnish national basketball team.

References

External links
FIBA Profile 
Champions League Profile
Profile at Eurobasket.com
Profile at RealGM.com

1995 births
Living people
AEK B.C. players
BK VEF Rīga players
Centers (basketball)
Finnish expatriate basketball people in the Czech Republic
Finnish expatriate basketball people in Greece
Finnish expatriate sportspeople in Latvia
Finnish expatriate basketball people in Spain
Finnish men's basketball players
People from Valkeala
Sportspeople from Kymenlaakso